Brandon Wagner (born April 18, 1983) is a Canadian wheelchair basketball player from Kitchener, Ontario. He began playing wheelchair basketball in 2002 and joined the U23 junior national team in 2005. In 2007 he won a silver medal at the Parapan American Games in Rio de Janeiro. A year later, he supported University of Illinois toward collegiate championship win. In 2009, he was named Student-Athlete of the Year at his alma-mater and two years later won bronze at the 2011 Parapan American Games in  Guadalajara, Mexico. In 2012 he participated at his first Olympics in London where he won gold.

References

External links
 

1983 births
Living people
Canadian men's wheelchair basketball players
Paralympic wheelchair basketball players of Canada
Paralympic gold medalists for Canada
Paralympic medalists in wheelchair basketball
Wheelchair basketball players at the 2012 Summer Paralympics
Medalists at the 2012 Summer Paralympics
Sportspeople from Kitchener, Ontario